Gomphoceridius is a monotypic genus of grasshoppers containing the species Gomphoceridius brevipennis and placed in the subfamily Gomphocerinae, tribe Gomphocerini.

The species is found in western, mainland Europe, with a notable populations in the Pyrenees.

References

External links 
 

Acrididae genera
Orthoptera of Europe
Gomphocerinae
Monotypic Orthoptera genera